2012 President's Cup may refer to:

 2012 President's Cup (Maldives), football
 2012 President's Cup (tennis)